The 1953 Montana State Bobcats football team was an American football team that represented Montana State University in the Rocky Mountain Conference (RMC) during the 1953 college football season. In its second season under head coach Tony Storti, the team compiled a 4–4 record (4–1 against conference opponents) and finished second out of six teams in the RMC.

Schedule

References

Montana State
Montana State Bobcats football seasons
Montana State Bobcats football